ARC Document Solutions, Inc. (formerly American Reprographics Company) is a publicly traded company that provides specialized document solutions, with an emphasis on the non-residential segment of the architecture, engineering and construction ("AEC") industry. The company is headquartered in San Ramon, CA.

The company provides onsite managed print services (MPS), archiving and information management (AIM), construction document and information management (CDIM), as well as the sale of technology applications to support these services to more than 90,000 customers. The company operates approximately 170 service centers throughout North America, provides its equipment and services onsite in more than 10,000 customer locations, and services its large enterprise customers with a corporate sales force called Global Solutions.

In Fiscal 2017, the company's revenue was $406 million. The company began as a $9 million stand-alone reprographics provider in Southern California in the late 1980s. It has grown to its present size and geographic coverage through the acquisition of more than 140 other companies. It remains the largest company of its kind in the U.S. with more than 2,400 employees. The company has received recognition from Forbes magazine (as one of its "Best 200 Small Companies"), Gartner, MPSA, BERTL, and Océ.

History
The company began in 1988 as Micro Device, dba "Ford Graphics", a $9 million, privately held Los Angeles-based reprographics company, acquired and managed by ARC's two founders, K. "Suri" Suriyakumar and S. "Mohan" Chandramohan. Following four acquisitions in California, the company was organized as "American Reprographics Company, L.L.C.", a California Limited Liability Corporation, in 1997. Acquired operations generally maintained their original brands in the marketplace to retain local recognition.

Following additional acquisitions that expanded the company's geographical reach into major metropolitan markets in a majority of U.S. states, American Reprographics L.L.C. made its initial public offering in February 2005 and was subsequently listed on the New York Stock Exchange (NYSE) under the ticker symbol "ARP."

Concurrent with the consolidation of its local brands in January 2010, the company's ticker symbol was changed to "ARC". The Delaware corporation name was formally changed to "ARC Document Solutions" in 2012.

References

External links
 
 

Companies listed on the New York Stock Exchange
Companies based in Contra Costa County, California